Delias wilemani is a butterfly in the family Pieridae. It was described by Karl Jordan in 1925. It is endemic to Taiwan (Indomalayan realm).

The wingspan is about 82–98 mm. Adults are similar to Delias subnubila, but may be distinguished by the large yellow patch on the hindwing recto, in cellule 2, between the discal and submarginal spots.

The larvae feed on Loranthus species.

References

External links
Delias at Markku Savela's Lepidoptera and Some Other Life Forms

wilemani
Butterflies described in 1925